William George Tozer (1829–1899) was a colonial bishop in the 19th century.

He was born in Teignmouth and educated at St John's College, Oxford and ordained in 1854. His first post was a curacy at St Mary Magdalene Munster Square. Later he was Vicar of Burgh-le-Marsh. In 1862 he was appointed leader of the Universities' Mission to Central Africa. He was Bishop in Central Africa for a decade and later held further Episcopal appointments in the West Indies. He died on 23 June 1899.

Notes

1829 births
People from Teignmouth
Alumni of St John's College, Oxford
Anglican missionaries in Malawi
19th-century Anglican bishops in the Caribbean
Anglican bishops in Central Africa
Anglican bishops of Jamaica
Anglican bishops of Belize
English Anglican missionaries
1899 deaths